Khonshu is a fictional character appearing in American comic books published by Marvel Comics. The character first appeared in Moon Knight #1 (Nov. 1980), created by Doug Moench and Bill Sienkiewicz, and is based on the Egyptian lunar god Khonsu. He is a member of the Heliopolitan pantheon and the patron of the superhero Moon Knight.

Khonshu appears in the live-action Marvel Cinematic Universe (MCU) miniseries Moon Knight, performed by Karim El-Hakim and voiced by F. Murray Abraham.

Fictional character biography
While Khonshu possessed Moon Knight during the hero's time with the West Coast Avengers, Khonshu was often shown as a largely benevolent god who wanted to assist the team. He was at times shown to be conflicted as to whether he should reveal his powers and what was worthy of it. He was able to effortlessly resist being controlled by the mutant The Voice.

However, he is shown to become more and more of an antagonistic role to Moon Knight starting in the 2006 series, where he would later become the main antagonist of the 2016 Moon Knight series, and the age of Khonshu storyline in Jason Aaron's run.

Moon Knight volume #4 initially treats Khonshu in a rather different way, portraying him as a harsh and unforgiving god of vengeance who is strengthened by the fear that his avatar inspires. Accordingly, he is quite prepared to manipulate Marc Spector's allies and enemies in order to revive Moon Knight's career, and is highly critical of Spector. As with many Moon Knight stories, the line between reality and hallucination is sometimes intentionally blurred, but aspects of the art and story do strongly suggest that Khonshu's actions are entirely real. Khonshu also appears as a statue, but primarily converses with Moon Knight in the mutilated form of the Bushman, a villain who was killed when Spector carved off his face. Khonshu calls this his 'greatest work.' Moon Knight eventually breaks the influence of Khonshu, seeing the god as a scale in line with a cockroach.

Chons, better known as Khonshu, was said to be the son of Atum (known to the Egyptian gods as Ammon Ra) and of Amaunet, air goddess of the Ogdoad pantheon. Another account stated that Khonshu was the adopted son of Amon Ra. He was the brother of Montu, and possibly Bes and Ptah, and was brother or half-brother to Bast and Sekhmet. According to Knull, Khonshu was actually an "elder shadow, dressed in local legend".

Around the year 1,000,000 BC, Khonshu was offended by not having been offered membership of the Stone Age Avengers and chose a mortal avatar - the first known Moon Knight - to enforce his will on Earth and antagonize the Avengers on his behalf, eventually leading to the establishment of the Cult of Khonshu and a succession of Moon Knights. Khonshu and Ra have been warring against each other for millennia, having been reborn again and again through earthly avatars, with Khonshu beating Ra in every instance. It was later revealed that Khonshu is the God of Time as well as Vengeance.

In Ancient Egypt, Khonshu posed as a human pharaoh at the Egyptian city of Thebes, the seat of worship of Ammon Ra, at the same time Osiris posed as a mortal ruler in the Egyptian city of Heliopolis. Kang the Conqueror arrived in Ancient Egypt looking for the God of Time Seeking three artifacts joined in a staff from Khonshu to gain dominion over time, Kang's plot is hampered when the staff is broken, scattering the three components he needs.

Khonshu visited Marc Spector, a young boy whose mind was broken and split into different personalities, and chose him as his avatar. However, Spector's family sent him to Putnam Psychiatric Hospital for treatment. After his father's death, Spector was allowed to leave the hospital temporarily to attend the funeral and a late luncheon, but ran away after hearing Khonshu's voice.

In the modern day, Khonshu later resurrected Marc Spector and blessed him with superhuman powers and abilities under the Moon. When Spector and Marlene travelled to Egypt, she was kidnapped by Jellim Yussaf, who hoped to find the treasure hidden in the Tomb of Seti II. Moon Knight tracked them down and during the fight he found the lost chamber, falling into the arms of a statue of Khonshu. The deity sent a gust of wind, allowing Moon Knight to glide down to knock out Yussaf. Spector decided to retire as a vigilante and sold his statue of Khonshu which was bought by Anubis the Jackal, a former enemy of the Moon Deity. Khonshu visited Spector in his dreams, hoping to bring him back as his champion on Earth. Spector gave in and travelled to Egypt. There he met the Priests of Khonshu, who gave him weapons and a suit designed by the time travelling Hawkeye thousands of years earlier. They informed him that his powers were affected by the phases of the moon and would be strongest at the moon's fullest. Using his newfound power, Spector defeated Anubis and took back the statue of Khonshu, which protected him when the temple collapsed.

Powers and abilities 
Khonshu has the conventional powers of the Ennead (the Heliopolitan gods), such as superhuman strength (Khonshu can bench press 60 tons), superhuman durability (he can withstand unspecified levels of injury), regenerative healing factor (Khonshu can be injured, but heals much faster and better than the healthiest human), immortality (he is immune to disease and aging), magic manipulation (Khonshu can manipulate mystic energies for supernatural effects such as interdimensional teleportation, telepathy, healing, resurrection, causing earthquakes and granting superhuman powers to mortal beings such as the Moon Knight), lunakinesis (manipulating objects made out of moonrocks, including Uru) and power absorption (Khonshu stole the powers of various heroes and stored them inside some Ankhs).

Other versions
In the Universe X saga it is suggested that Uatu the Watcher who lives on the moon was the original inspiration for the Egyptian moon god Khonshu.

In other media
 The Khonshu possessed Marc Spector appears as an alternate skin for Moon Knight in the video game Marvel: Ultimate Alliance.
 Khonshu appears in the live-action Marvel Cinematic Universe (MCU) television series Moon Knight, performed by Karim El-Hakim and voiced by F. Murray Abraham. This version of Khonshu is an outcast amongst his fellow Egyptian gods for waging a "one-god war on perceived injustices", which necessitates him to find and use his avatar, Marc Spector. Additionally, Khonshu was described by the series' head writer Jeremy Slater as an "imperious and sort of snotty and vengeful" deity, who is prone to temper tantrums and is dealing with his own insecurities, adding he was more interested in a version of the character that had "his own moral failings and weaknesses" rather than one who was "always right and impervious to mistakes". Abraham called Khonshu "outrageous" and "capable of doing anything and charming his way out of it". As well, Abraham believed Khonshu was unselfish and willing to sacrifice himself the same way he demands sacrifice from others.

References

External links
 

Characters created by Bill Sienkiewicz
Characters created by Doug Moench
Comics characters introduced in 1980
Fictional characters with death or rebirth abilities
Fictional characters with immortality
Fictional characters with superhuman durability or invulnerability
Khonsu
Marvel Comics characters who use magic
Marvel Comics characters who can teleport
Marvel Comics characters with accelerated healing
Marvel Comics characters with superhuman strength
Marvel Comics deities
Marvel Comics male characters
Marvel Comics telepaths